Samuel L. Greenberg (November 12, 1898 – April 24, 1992) was an American lawyer and politician from New York.

Life
Greenberg was born on November 12, 1898, in New York City. He graduated from Public School No. 149 in 1911; from Boys High School in 1914; from Columbia College; and from New York University School of Law in 1919. During World War I he served in the U.S. Navy. He married Esther (died 1987), and their only child was Gloria Mae (Greenberg) St. Lifer.

Greenberg was a member of the New York State Senate from 1943 to 1972, sitting in the 164th, 165th, 166th, 167th, 168th, 169th, 170th, 171st, 172nd, 173rd, 174th, 175th, 176th, 177th, 178th and 179th legislatures. He was Chairman of the Committee on Finance in 1965.

He was an alternate delegate to the 1948 and 1952 Democratic National Conventions.

He died on April 24, 1992.

Sources

1898 births
1992 deaths
Politicians from Brooklyn
Democratic Party New York (state) state senators
Columbia College (New York) alumni
New York University School of Law alumni
20th-century American politicians
Boys High School (Brooklyn) alumni